Trio Mandili (მანდილი, "woman's headscarf") is a Georgian musical group which currently consists of Tatuli Mgeladze (თათული მგელაძე), Tako Tsiklauri (თაკო წიკლაური), and Mariam Kurasbediani (მარიამ ქურასბედიანი).

They perform polyphonic singing accompanied by a panduri, a traditional Georgian string instrument. They became popular in Georgia when they uploaded a music video in which they perform a Georgian folk song, "Apareka". This video, posted online, gathered over seven million views.

Trio Mandili have sung songs in other languages, such as the Hindi song "Goron Ki Na Kalon Ki Duniya Hai Dilwalon Ki" (English translation: Not to fair-skinned people or dark-skinned people, the world belongs to those with good hearts) that was performed on Republic Day, as well as the Polish song "Lipka" (English translation: Little linden).

In 2017, the group participated in Evroviizis erovnul konkurss with the song "Me da shen" with the chance to represent Georgia at the Eurovision Song Contest 2017. They performed 10th and ultimately finished in 12th place with 65 points.

Discography

Band members
Tatuli Mgeladze – lead and backing vocals
Mariam Kurasbediani – backing and occasional lead vocals, panduri (a traditional Georgian string instrument)
Tako Tsiklauri – backing and occasional lead vocals

References

External links 
 
 
 
 Trio Mandili Twitter account

Folk music groups
Georgian-language singers
Musical groups from Georgia (country)